Stephanie Williams (born in Newcastle, New South Wales) is an Australian ballet dancer, a member of the corps de ballet of the American Ballet Theatre.

Dance career
Stephanie Williams started learning ballet with the Marie Walton-Mahon (founder & creator of Progressing Ballet Technique) Dance Academy in Newcastle at the age of 8. She joined The Australian Ballet School and performed the double rôle of Odette and Odile in Swan Lake at her graduation performance in 2006. She then joined The Australian Ballet and was promoted to coryphée. She was a guest artist with Morphoses/The Wheeldon Company at the Sydney Festival in 2009.

She won both the Telstra Ballet Dancer Award and Telstra People's Choice Award for 2009, the second dancer to win both awards.

Williams joined the corps de ballet of the Dutch National Ballet in 2011.

In January 2012 she joined American Ballet Theatre as a member of the corps de ballet.

Selected repertoire

 Odette and Odile in Graeme Murphy's Swan Lake, 2006
 Idée fixe in Krzysztof Pastor's Symphonie fantastique
 Maiden in Alexei Ratmansky's Firebird, world première 2012

Awards

 Gold Medal, 10th Asian Pacific International Ballet Competition in Tokyo, 2005
 Telstra Ballet Dancer Award and People's Choice Award, 2009

References

Australian ballerinas
Telstra Ballet Dancer Award winners
Telstra People's Choice Award winners
Living people
People from Newcastle, New South Wales
Year of birth missing (living people)
American Ballet Theatre dancers